Chunyu may refer to:

Chunyu (name), a name of Chinese origin
Chunyu (ward), administrative ward in Tanzania

See also
Chunyun